USS Advance (AMc-63) was an Accentor-class coastal minesweeper acquired by the United States Navy for the task of removing mines from minefields laid in the water to prevent ships from passing.

The fifth ship to be named Advance by the Navy,  AMc-63 was laid down on 12 April 1941 at Greenport, Long Island, New York, by the Greenport Basin and Construction Company as Aggressor; renamed Advance on 23 May 1941; launched on 28 June 1941; sponsored by Mary R. Gillespie; and placed in service at the New York Navy Yard on 10 October 1941, Lt. Walter E. Goering, USNR, in charge.

World War II service
The coastal minesweeper completed her outfitting at Brooklyn, New York, and moved south to Norfolk, Virginia. After mine detection and sweeping training under the auspices of the Naval Mine Warfare School at Yorktown, Virginia, Advance began operations with the forces assigned to the Commandant, 5th Naval District.

Based at Little Creek, Virginia, she served directly under the Commander, Inshore Patrol, 5th Naval District. That duty lasted until late May 1944 when she was reassigned to the 1st Naval District.

Advance operated along the New England coast until the middle of June 1945. At that time, she returned briefly to Norfolk before continuing on to Charleston, South Carolina, in July. There, the minesweeper reported to the Commandant, 6th Naval District, for disposition.

Post-war inactivation
On 6 December 1945, Advance was placed out of service and berthed in the Wando River. Her name was struck from the Navy list on 3 January 1946, and she was sold for scrapping on 3 March 1947 to Lloyd Lambert of Baltimore, Maryland.

References

External links
 Dictionary of American Naval Fighting Ships
 NavSource Online: Mine Warfare Vessel Photo Archive – Advance (AMc 63) – ex-Aggressor

 

Accentor-class minesweepers
Ships built in Greenport, New York
1941 ships
World War II minesweepers of the United States